Ilya Baglay (born 21 April 1998) is a Belarusian professional footballer who plays Baranovichi.

References

External links 
 
 

1998 births
Living people
Belarusian footballers
Association football defenders
FC Minsk players
FC Gorodeya players
FC Slonim-2017 players
FC Baranovichi players